The 1976 United States presidential election in Louisiana took place on November 2, 1976, as part of the 1976 United States presidential election. State voters chose ten representatives, or electors, to the Electoral College, who voted for president and vice president.

Louisiana was won by Jimmy Carter (D–Georgia), with 51.73% of the popular vote. Carter defeated incumbent President Gerald Ford (R–Michigan), who finished with 45.95% of the popular vote. No third-party candidate amounted to 1% of the vote; American Party candidate Lester Maddox came the closest with 0.79%.

Jimmy Carter went on to become the 39th president of the United States. , this is the last election in which Grant Parish and West Carroll Parish voted for a Democratic presidential candidate.

Results

Results by parish

See also
 United States presidential elections in Louisiana

References

Louisiana
1976
1976 Louisiana elections